Ramón Martínez (12 June 1926 – 3 August 1999) was a Spanish fencer. He competed in the individual and team sabre events at the 1960 Summer Olympics.

References

External links
 

1926 births
1999 deaths
Spanish male sabre fencers
Olympic fencers of Spain
Fencers at the 1960 Summer Olympics